Schoenorchis, commonly known as flea orchids, or 匙唇兰属 (chi chun lan shu) in Chinese, is a genus of flowering plants from the orchid family, Orchidaceae. Plants in this genus are small epiphytes with thin roots, thin leafy stems with leaves in two ranks and tiny fragrant, almost tube-shaped flowers with a prominently spurred labellum. There are about twenty five species found from tropical and subtropical Asia to the Western Pacific.

Description
Orchids in the genus Schoenorchis are small epiphytic, monopodial herbs with thin roots, sometimes with branching stems and flat to almost cylindrical leaves with their bases sheathing the thin, fibrous stems. The flowers are small, fleshy, fragrant, often white or reddish purple and do not open widely. The sepals and petals overlap at the base so that the flowers often appear tube-shaped. The labellum is rigidly fixed to the column, usually longer than the petals and has three lobes with a spur at its base. The side lobes of the labellum are erect and the middle lobe is often spatula-shaped.

Etymology
The name Schoenorchis is derived from the Ancient Greek words schoinos meaning "sedge", "rush-rope" or "rope" and orchis meaning "testicle" or "orchid". This is thought to refer to the terete leaves of some of the species.

Taxonomy
The genus Schoenorchis was first formally described in 1825 by Carl Ludwig Blume from an unpublished description by Caspar Reinwardt and the description was published in Bijdragen tot de flora van Nederlandsch Indië. The type species is Schoenorchis juncifolia Reinw. ex Blume.

Sections
The genus was divided into the sections Pumila, Schoenorchis, and Racemosae.

Species list 
The following is a list of species accepted by the World Checklist of Selected Plant Families as at January 2019:
 Schoenorchis aurea (Ridl.) Garay - Sarawak
 Schoenorchis brevirachis Seidenf. - Vietnam
 Schoenorchis buddleiflora (Schltr. & J.J.Sm.) J.J.Sm. - Sumatra, Borneo
 Schoenorchis endertii (J.J.Sm.) Christenson & J.J.Wood - Borneo
 Schoenorchis fragrans (C.S.P.Parish & Rchb.f.) Seidenf. & Smitinand - Yunnan, Assam, Myanmar, Thailand, Vietnam 
 Schoenorchis gemmata (Lindl.) J.J.Sm. - Fujian, Guangxi, Hainan, Hong Kong, Tibet, Yunnan, Bhutan, Cambodia, Assam, Laos, Myanmar, Nepal, Thailand, Vietnam
 Schoenorchis hangianae Aver. & Duy
 Schoenorchis jerdoniana (Wight) Garay - southern India
 Schoenorchis juncifolia Reinw. ex Blume - Borneo, Java, Malaysia, Sumatra  
 Schoenorchis manilaliana M.Kumar & Sequiera - Kerala
 Schoenorchis micrantha Reinw. ex Blume - Thailand, Vietnam, Malaysia, Indonesia, Philippines, New Guinea, Queensland, Solomons, Fiji, New Caledonia, Samoa, Vanuatu 
 Schoenorchis minutiflora (Ridl.) J.J.Sm. - Andaman Islands, Thailand, Malaysia
 Schoenorchis nivea (Lindl.) Schltr. - Sri Lanka
 Schoenorchis pachyacris (J.J.Sm.) J.J.Sm. - Java, Sumatra
 Schoenorchis pachyglossa (Lindl.) Garay - Borneo
 Schoenorchis paniculata Blume - Java, Sumatra, Borneo, Bali, Flores, Lombok, Timor
 Schoenorchis phitamii Aver. - Vietnam
 Schoenorchis sarcophylla Schltr. - Papua New Guinea, Queensland
 Schoenorchis scolopendria Aver. - Vietnam
 Schoenorchis secundiflora (Ridl.) J.J.Sm. - Borneo, Thailand, Malaysia
 Schoenorchis seidenfadenii Pradhan - Thailand, Vietnam
 Schoenorchis smeeana (Rchb.f.) Jalal, Jayanthi & Schuit.
 Schoenorchis subulata (Schltr.) J.J.Sm. - Sulawesi
 Schoenorchis sumatrana J.J.Sm. - Sumatra
 Schoenorchis tortifolia (Jayaw.) Garay - Sri Lanka
 Schoenorchis vanoverberghii Ames - Taiwan, Philippines

Newly described species
Schoenorchis mishmensis K.Gogoi, Mega & Chowlu - India

Distribution
Orchids in this genus occur in China, the Indian subcontinent, Indochina, Malesia, New Guinea, Fiji, New Caledonia, Samoa, Vanuatu and northern Australia.

Ecology

Pollination
The small, entomophilous, colourful flowers of Schoenorchis gemmata produce nectar and fragrance during the daytime and they are believed to be pollinated by insects of the order Hymenoptera. More specifically, pollination by bees has been reported. Apart from insect pollination, autogamy has been also reported to occur, for instance in Schoenorchis paniculata, and possibly in Schoenorchis sarcophylla.

Conservation
Some species are very rare. Only 20 individuals of Schoenorchis mishmensis K.Gogoi, Mega & Chowlu are known to exist in the wild, and it is therefore thought to be critically endangered.

See also
List of Orchidaceae genera

References

Vandeae genera
Aeridinae
Taxa named by Carl Ludwig Blume